Regional School District 12 (RSD 12) is a school district headquartered in the Washington Depot area of Washington, Connecticut. It serves Washington, Bridgewater, and Roxbury.

In 2012 the district had 841 students.

Schools
Secondary:
 Shepaug Valley School - Grades 6-12
Primary (all K-5):
 Burnham School (Bridgewater)
 Booth Free School (Roxbury)
 Washington Primary School (Washington)

References

Further reading
  - Letter to the editor written by two members of the school board

External links
 
School districts in Connecticut
Education in Litchfield County, Connecticut